Maurizio Anzeri (born April 8, 1969, in Loano, Italy) is an Italian contemporary artist living and working in London. He works in a variety of media including sculpture, photography, drawing and traditional craft techniques.

Education

From 1996 to 1999  Anzeri attended The London Institute, Camberwell College of Arts and studied a Bachelor of Arts degree in Sculpture and Graphic Design. Anzeri went on to do a master's degree in Fine Art Sculpture at the Slade School of Fine Art, London from 2002- 2005...

Career 
As a sculptor, Anzeri uses synthetic hair to create slightly ominous, sentinel-like works. Piled into totemic forms, the bundled locks are simultaneously woven into curls, plaits and pleats.  He produced sculptures with  Alexander McQueen in 2000 and went on to work for a year with Isabella Blow creating "wearable" sculptures before doing a master's degree in Fine Art Sculpture at the Slade School of Fine Art. Since graduating in 2005, Anzeri has exhibited his work in solo and group exhibitions across the world and his work is held in several public and private art collections.

Anzeri is described as a pioneer in the art of embroidery on found photographs. The inspiration for his craft came from seeing images of relatives mending fishing nets on the Italian coast of Loano, near Genoa, and because of his family history, he saw his attraction to working with thread as verging on the inevitable. Fusing his earlier work with hair sculpture and his passion for old photographs, embroidery became a deliberately expressive tool for his work Anzeri’s elaborate needle-work set against somber backgrounds results in a sharp juxtaposition; and despite the history of both the technique and the images used, he produces work which treads new ground He conceived the term photo-sculpture to define his embroidery work with photographs

Anzeri exhibited at The Saatchi Gallery in the exhibition Newspeak: British Art Now in 2009, an exhibition that received significant coverage and media attention. Anzeri was one of Saatchi's 50 new artists who were being touted as the ‘new YBA’s’ The exhibition was cited as an explosion of new and vigorous forms which demonstrate the strength of contemporary art in Britain.

Anzeri won the 2010 Vauxhall Collective bursary prize for Fine Art and the resulting solo exhibition ‘The Garden Party’ at the Q Forum, London included sculptures made from long ropes of synthetic human hair.

In 2011 Anzeri held his first solo show in a major UK institution at the Baltic Centre for Contemporary Art, Family Day. The Baltic Gallery press release described the exhibition “Using individual and group portraits of unknown people of the 1930s and 1940s found in flea markets, Anzeri overlays meticulously patterned coloured threads by stitching and sewing directly on to the photographic surface. Obscuring part of the photograph, he both hides and heightens features of the face. These intricate additions create something almost three-dimensional, transforming flat images in to objects with a charged psychological presence. Anzeri draws upon a wide range of influences including contemporary fashion, voodoo ceremonies and surrealist imagery. Precise juxtapositions in his work recall the collage of the Surrealists and the photomontages of German Dadaists Hannah Hoch and Raoul Hausmann 

As part of The King and I exhibition in Shanghai, China, Anzeri had his first public commission of a sculpture, Profiles for the Shanghai Gallery of Art in 2017.

Anzeri collaborated with the Italian music collective, C’mon Tigre on a music video Mono No Aware in a video directed by Marco Molinelli and was nominated for the Los Angeles Film Award for best music video in 2019. The film was also screened at the Bologna Film Festival Il Cinema Retrovato

Anzeri’s art works are held in public and private collections including the Victoria and Albert Museum London that has five of Anzeri’s works in the permanent collection and the hair sculpture coat that Anzeri made for Alexander McQueen Lady Ugolino in the Alexander McQueen collection; the Saatchi Collection, London has eighteen of Anzeri's works [;  the Fondazione Agnelli, Torino Italy; Shanghai Gallery of Art, China; Gagosian Collection; Rothschild Collection;  Ivor Braka Collection, London;  Statoil Collection, Oslo Norway; Missoni Collection, Milan Italy; The Museum Of Everything, London;   Museo Cantonale, Lugano Switzerland;  Museum Kunstpalast, Düsseldorf, Germany; Pier24 Photography, San Francisco USA

Notable artworks include Lady Ugolino 2000, sculpture  Giovanni 2009, embroidery on found photograph The Party 2010, a series of nine sculptures made from synthetic hair and metal Profiles, a public commission of a sculpture situated outside the Shanghai Gallery of Art

Exhibitions 
In 2005 Anzeri held his final Master in Fine Arts Degree show at the Slade School of Fine Art in London. After graduating he took part in several group exhibitions across Europe including the Museo CAMEC for the Biennale Europea Arti Visive in LaSpezia in Italy Kunsthalle at the Locarno Film Festival in Locarno, Switzerland, Drifting Clouds at the Galleria IMAGE Furini, Arezzo Italy, L’Angelo Sigillato (The Sealed Angel) at the Museo Icone Russe in Peccioli Italy The Beautiful Children at The Wharf Road Project, London UK and Whispers of Immortality at the Natalia Goldin Gallery in Stockholm, Sweden

In 2008 Anzeri was one of 30 emerging artists to be nominated for the Sovereign European Art Prize with a group exhibition at Somerset House in London That year he went on to exhibit at The Museum Of Everything in London, Starting with a photograph at the Michael Hoppen Contemporary Art Gallery in London and One Night in Paris for  The Photographer's Gallery at  PARISPHOTO  in Paris and London

Anzeri was part of the inaugural exhibition of the new Photographers Gallery in London in 2009. The exhibition The Photographic Object  that included artists; Walead Beshty; Vanessa Billy; Annette Kelm; Gerhard Richter; Alina Szapocznikow; Wolfgang Tilmans; Andy Warhol and Catherine Yass who, like Anzeri, all worked closely with the medium of photography The Photographers Gallery brought together the nine artists who represent the physical and tactile quality of the photograph often lost in today’s digital internet world, ranging from the established (Andy Warhol) to the emerging (Maurizio Anzeri). A review of the exhibition described Anzeri's work as “a series of images (that) are punctured and altered with colourful and patterned string. The black and white figures lose their identity in the portraits as the web of thread masks their face leaving only the orifices untouched.”

In 2010 Anzeri won the Vauxhall Collective Prize for Fine Art. His solo exhibition for the prize The Garden Party included ghostly installations constructed entirely out of hair and was held at the Q forum in London Anzeri went on in 2010 to exhibit his work in solo exhibitions Lunatico at the Rupert Pfab Gallery in Düsseldorf Germany Darwin’s Tears at the Luce Gallery in Turin Italy and Family Day at the Galleria Image Furini in Arezzo, Italy and group exhibitions Limited/Unlimited at La Pelanda Macro in Rome,  Italy Faces at the Monica DeCardenas Gallery in Milan, Italy and Newspeak: British Art Now at the Saatchi Gallery in London

Anzeri had his first solo show  in a major UK gallery Family Day in 2011 at the Baltic Centre for Contemporary Art and group shows  Makeup at the Galleria A Palazzo in Brescia, Italy, Version and Diversions  at the Temple Bar Gallery in Dublin, Ireland. 2011 was the first year Anzeri exhibited his work in the US with the exhibition Intersection at the Marlborough Gallery in New York  and Alexander McQueen's Savage Beauty exhibition held after McQueen's death at the Metropolitan Museum of Art, New York  Anzeri created ‘Lady Ugolino’  a sculptured coat made out of hair for McQueen's Eshu collection in 2000 and this was featured in the exhibition. Lady Ugolino was also shown at the Savage Beauty exhibition in London's V&A museum in 2015 and is now part of the V&A museum's permanent collection.

In 2012 Anzeri took part in group exhibitions Capogiro at the Museo Di Stato Della Repubblica in San Marino and MIART in Milan, Italy

In 2013 Anzeri had another major solo exhibition at the Chapter Arts Centre in Cardiff, But it's Not Late, It's Only Dark. The Guardian Newspaper’s Art Critic, Sean O’ Hagan said “Anzeri has said that his embroidered images suggest "other possible evolutionary dimensions for the people pictured", but his work has a surrealist rather than a Darwinian undertow. Sombre-looking children and sophisticated adults take on an absurdist aspect. The people pictured all but disappear in the process, becoming shadows or outlines beneath the lines. What was once a portrait is something else entirely: a formal, sculptural, diagrammatic artwork in which identity and expression is camouflaged. Anzeri creates something new and surprising by applying an old-fashioned craft to old-fashioned artefacts He also took part in the group exhibition UK Photography Now at the Dong Gang Museum in South Korea

Anzeri was commissioned to do a portrait by the Bavarian State Opera in Munich alongside other artists including Elizabeth Peyton, Vik Muniz and Stephan Balkenhol. Anzeri's portrait was a tribute to the soprano, Astrid Varnay that formed part of an exhibition at the Bavarian State Opera in 2014.  Anzeri's work with found photographs inspired the Secondhand exhibition by Pier 24 in San Francisco in which he had a solo exhibition room. Pier 24Director, Christopher McCall wrote “..I encountered the intricately embroidered images of London based artist Maurizio Anzeri, who takes great pride in scouring flea markets and online stores for historic studio portraits. I wondered what historical precedent if any, existed for his unconventional approach. ..over the next several months I collected over 50 unique postcards to include alongside Anzeri’s surreal portraits; it is clear that these objects, once perceived commonplace, not only are part of the medium’s history but also need to be acknowledged and preserved."

Anzeri took part in the exhibition The Needles Eye at the Kode Museum in Bergen, Norway in 2014 and in the Oslo National Museum of Art, Architecture and Design in 2015. The exhibition was the reflection of a new interest in material-based art and hand-crafting techniques that had emerged in contemporary art and had gained new relevance in Northern Europe.

In 2015 VaPensiero  Anzeri's mobile sculpture made of 39 found photographs, embroidery and steel was exhibited at Miart- The International Fair of Contemporary and Modern Art , for the FANTOM photo foundation in Milan, Italy. He did a series of embroidered landscapes for The Mapmaker's Dream at the Haines Gallery in San Francisco, USA

In Anzeri's exhibition Many for the Haines Gallery in 2016 at  Volta New York,  his embroidered portraits were described as what was once a portrait is something else entirely; a formal, sculptural, diagrammatic artwork in which identity and expression are both camouflaged and revealed, engaging viewers in a sustained conversation and his embroidered landscapes the angled coloured threads suggest the tracing of recurring, unseen phenomena such as magnetic fields or paranormal activity. Yet Anzeri's interventions in to natural scenes...can just as easily promote an underlying sense of harmony

But my love does not die: works from the Alloggia collection in Rome, were exhibited at the Ivan Bruschi Museum in Arezzo, Italy in June 2016. The Alloggia collection includes works by Anzeri;  Family 2008 and Military 2008, both embroidery on found photographs from the Family Album series A Take on Vintage Photography at the Photography Museum, Vilnius Lithuania, Anzeri exhibited alongside thirteen Lithuanian and foreign artists of different generations, who use vintage photographs for creation of new meanings   Anzeri joined a talented assortment of artists in the group-show Allure, which opened in May at the C/O in Berlin, Germany and exhibited at  PhotoLondon for The Photographer’s Gallery

Also in 2016, Anzeri was commissioned to create large scale art works and sculpture at Milan’s Royal Palace for an exhibition called The King and I The artists - Maurizio Anzeri, Arthur Arbesser, Paola Besana, Gentucca Bini, Matthew Herbert, Taisuke Koyama, Francesco Simeti, Adrian Wong & Shane Aspegren - have been called to write a collective story in which the fairy-tale imagination establishes a dialogue with the architecture and decorations of the apartment, including sculptures, photographs, clothes, installations and performances  in 2017, The King and I was exhibited at the Shanghai Gallery of Art in Shanghai

In 2017 Anzeri was in London with Iconoclasts: Art Outside of the Mainstream at the Saatchi Gallery Amongst mixed reviews for the exhibition as a whole Anzeri received plaudits for his works; Among the 13 ‘iconoclasts’ on show was Maurizio Anzeri, known for photographic portraits that he embellishes with embroidery. Often the embroidery functions as an elaborate mask and, in the case of Yvonne, the effect is almost Cubist, recalling the multifaceted portraits of Picasso. Inspired by his Italian fishing heritage, the embroidery adds a third dimension to his photographs, offering an arresting juxtaposition of textures and colours, the Iconoclasts show was weirdly uneven: aside from Anzeri six rooms and within this myriad of ‘defiers’, you'll find the likes of French artist Thomas Mailaender, whose artworks dabble in replacing found images onto human flesh ... Alongside this, you will also find the intricate stitchings of Italian-British artist Maurizio Anzeri; the two traditional arts of fishing net repair and the 2D image being delicately spliced together despite the unlikely partnership Lay it on the line was Anzeri's solo exhibition of embroidered landscapes at the Haines Gallery in San Francisco, USA 

Anzeri's 2018 exhibitions included Planetarium at the Galleria Vittorio Emanuele in  Milan Italy Acrobat Wolf  (La Loup Acrobate) where he launched a book with Arthur H. Editions at Virgile Lagrand in Paris, France and his solo exhibition In-Equilibrio at the Haines Gallery in San Francisco, USA Anzeri collaborated with the magazine Self Service for their 25th anniversary edition to create artworks using embroidery and collage on photographs of Bjork, Kate Moss, Tilda Swinton and Charlotte Rampling These works were part of the Self Service: 25 Years of Fashion, People and Ideas Reconsidered exhibition at Dallas Contemporary

In 2019, Anzeri was part of the group photography exhibition Looking Back:About Face 10 Years of Pier 24 Photography in San Francisco, USA alongside names such as Robert Adams, Diane Arbus, Richard Avedon, Dorothea Lange, and Hiroshi Sugimoto a solo exhibition Likenesses at the Haines Gallery in San Francisco, USA, Te – Che at the Convento di Santa Caterina in Borgo, Italy and the  art video  Mono No Aware that Anzeri made with the Italian music collective, C'mon Tigre was screened at the  Il Cinema Ritrovato Film Festival in Bologna, Italy. The film was nominated for the Los Angeles Film Awards for Best Music Video in 2019 

From November 2021 Anzeri is exhibiting in a group exhibition Known and Strange at the Victoria and Albert Museum in London. featuring the artwork Lucy 2018.

The solo exhibition On the Move from April 2022 highlights Anzeri's new body of work of life size puppets made from plasters and brass at the public art gallery The Box in Plymouth, England. Anzeri is also exhibiting in the group exhibition The Dress Code  showing A Little Black Dress, a wearable sculpture Anzeri made for the iconic fashion editor Isabella Blow in 2000.

The exhibition OVERDOSE from April 2022, at the Design Museum Holon in Israel includes two of Anzeri's embroidered portraits of found photographs.

Awards 
2010 Vauxhall Collective Prize for Fine Art

Art Education 
Anzeri has been a visiting lecturer at the Royal College of Art, the Winchester School of Art and the Cardiff School of Art and Design He has taught on the Tate Britain and Tate Modern education programmes, the Tate Lab

Anzeri's work is used by art teachers in the national secondary school curriculum in England He took part in the Great Art Quest, a national arts project designed by The Prince's Foundation for Children & the Arts

Publications 
Anzeri's works and exhibitions have featured in print and online publications including; Scenes of the Real and Cathedrals of the Mind, 2006 L'Angelo Sigillato (The Sealed Angel) 2008 Family Day, 2009, Photography Now, 2010 Fantom- Photographic Quarterly, 2010 Crafts Magazine, 2010 Vogue Italia no 722, 2010, Newspeak- British Art Now, 2010, NY Arts Magazine Volume 17	2011, Another Man 2011, Elephant Issue 9, 2011, The Embroidered Secrets of Maurizio Anzeri, 2011Dazed and Confused Issue.98, 2011, Experimenta 2011, Contour Magazine, 2011, New York Times Magazine 2011 Kunst, 2011 Design Boom Maurizio Anzeri's Embroidered Photographs, 2012, Dazed and Confused November 2012, Surface Design Journal, 2012, The Art of Embroidery- Vogue, 2012

Lokalirri, 2012, The Guardian Newspaper 2013, The Drawbridge issue 18 Ghosts 2013, Juxtapoz Magazine 2013, Contemporary Art Magazine Review,2013, The Guardian Newspaper 2014, Secondhand 2014, Alta Data 2014, EYEBOOK 2015, El Pais 2015, Conversations 2015 Phoebe Augier e mag 2015, Volta NY 2016,  Iconoclasts- Art out of the mainstream 2017, Silas Marner 2018 Wall Street International Magazine 2018, MoonMan 2019, Looking Back- 10 years of Pier 24 Photography 2019, Self Service Issue 50 2019, La Repubblica 2019 Das Alphabet der Puppen, Camilla Grudova

References

External links 
https://www.maurizioanzeri.com

Italian contemporary artists
Alumni of the Slade School of Fine Art
Living people
1969 births
Italian embroiderers